Neil Burgess (born 1966)  is a Professor of Cognitive neuroscience at University College London and a Wellcome Trust Principal Research Fellow. He has made important contributions to understanding memory and spatial cognition by developing computational models relating behaviour to activity in biological neural networks.

Education
Burgess was educated at University College London (UCL), where he was an undergraduate student of Mathematics and Physics. He completed his postgraduate study in theoretical physics in the School of Physics and Astronomy at the University of Manchester supervised by Michael A. Moore, where he began working on models of memory with Graham Hitch and was awarded a PhD in 1990.

Research and career
Burgess research in neuroscience has developed models to explain how networks of neurons allow us to represent, remember and imagine our location within the surrounding environment. These models provide a quantitative understanding of how spatial memory, episodic memory and autobiographical memory function (and dysfunction) depend on human brain activity. With Tom Hartley at the University of York and Colin Lever at Durham University he both predicted and discovered neurons representing environmental boundaries.

Awards and honours
Burgess was elected a Fellow of the Royal Society (FRS) in 2017 and a Fellow of the Academy of Medical Sciences (FMedSci) in 2009 having previously held a Royal Society University Research Fellowship.

References 

Fellows of the Royal Society
Fellows of the Academy of Medical Sciences (United Kingdom)
Alumni of the University of Manchester
Wellcome Trust Principal Research Fellows
Royal Society University Research Fellows
British neuroscientists
Living people
People from Oakington
1966 births